Nriputungavarman was a king of the Pallava dynasty. Nriputungavarman was the son of Nandivarman III. Nrpatungavarman had at two queens, Viramahadevi and Kadavanmadevi, as both appear in his inscriptions as donors. In his architectural contribution, the rock-cut shrine at Namakkal and a Vishnu temple built at Ukkal is made for the queen

A copper plate inscription dating to the eighth year of the reign of Nriputunga Varman was unearthed in Bahour in 1879. The inscription in both Sanskrit and Tamil describes a grant of income from three villages to a seat of learning at Bahour.

References

Pallava kings